Voronino is a rural locality (a village) in Gorodetskoye Rural Settlement, Kichmengsko-Gorodetsky District, Vologda Oblast, Russia. The population was 21 as of 2002.

Geography 
Voronino is located 18 km southwest of Kichmengsky Gorodok (the district's administrative centre) by road. Shelygino is the nearest rural locality.

References 

Rural localities in Kichmengsko-Gorodetsky District